Isiaka Olawale (born 11 November 1983) is a Nigerian football player. He currently plays for Dolphins F.C.

History
On 25 January 2012, after protracted negotiations, Dolphins and Kwara United finally agreed on a fee for the transfer of central midfielder, Isiaka Olawale, to the league champions. Olawale got the start and scored his first club goal in the second leg of the 2012 CAF Champions League first-round game against CD Elá Nguema.

International career 
He has played for the Nigeria national team and the Nigeria national beach soccer team.

References 

1983 births
Living people
Nigerian footballers
Yoruba sportspeople
Association football midfielders
Nigeria international footballers
Lobi Stars F.C. players
Kwara United F.C. players
WA Tlemcen players
Expatriate footballers in Algeria
Nigerian expatriate footballers